Ondřej Kolář is a Czech name that may refer to persons:
Ondřej Kolář (footballer) (born 1994), Czech footballer
Ondřej Kolář (politician) (born 1984), Czech politician

See also
Kolář, a surname
Ondřej, a given name